The 2002 Colgate Raiders football team was an American football team that represented Colgate University during the 2002 NCAA Division I-AA football season. Colgate tied for the Patriot League championship but did not qualify for the national playoffs. 

In its seventh season under head coach Dick Biddle, the team compiled a 9–3 record. Tom McCune and Max Wynn were the team captains. 

The Raiders outscored opponents 301 to 203. Their 6–1 conference record tied atop the eight-team Patriot League standings. Co-champion Fordham, which had dealt Colgate its only loss in conference play, was selected to receive the Patriot League's automatic berth in the national Division I-AA playoffs.  Unlike 1999, the last time the Patriot League had a tie for first place, in 2002 Colgate did not receive an at-large invitation to the playoffs.

From preseason to the last week of play, Colgate did not appear in the national Division I-AA top 25 rankings. After winning the co-championship, Colgate entered the rankings at No. 25 in the final poll of the year.

The team played its home games at Andy Kerr Stadium in Hamilton, New York.

Schedule

References

Colgate
Colgate Raiders football seasons
Patriot League football champion seasons
Colgate Raiders football